The Apostolic Vicariate of Puerto Maldonado is a Latin Church apostolic vicariate of the Catholic Church in Peru. Its cathedra is located in the episcopal see of Puerto Maldonado.

History
 January 5, 1900: Established as Apostolic Prefecture of San Domingo de Urubamba from the Diocese of Cusco
 July 4, 1913: Promoted as Apostolic Vicariate of Urubamba y Madre de Dios
 March 10, 1949: Renamed as Apostolic Vicariate of Puerto Maldonado

Leadership

Ordinaries, in reverse chronological order
 Vicar Apostolics of Puerto Maldonado, below
 Bishop David Martínez De Aguirre Guinea, O.P. (June 23, 2015 – present)
 Bishop Francisco González Hernández, O.P. (February 2, 2008 – June 23, 2015)
 Bishop Juan José Larrañeta Olleta, O.P. (April 26, 1980 – February 2, 2008)
 Bishop Javier Miguel Ariz Huarte, O.P. (May 27, 1959 – April 26, 1980, appointed Auxiliary Bishop of Lima
 Bishop José María García Graín, O.P. (March 10, 1949 – May 27, 1959)
 Vicars Apostolic of Urubamba y Madre de Dios (Roman Rite), below
 Bishop Enrique Alvarez González, O.P. (July 14, 1946 – June 2, 1948)
 Bishop Sabas Sarasola Esparza, O.P. (June 13, 1923 – February 29, 1944)
 Bishop Ramón Zubieta y Les, O.P. (July 4, 1913 – November 19, 1921)
 Prefect Apostolic of San Domingo de Urubamba (Roman Rite), below 
 Bishop Ramón Zubieta y Les, O.P. (1901 – July 4, 1913)

Coadjutor Vicars Apostolic
Javier Miguel Ariz Huarte, O.P. (1952-1959)
Francisco González Hernández, O.P. (2001-2008)
David Martínez De Aguirre Guinea, O.P. (2014-2015)

Auxiliary bishops
Ignacio Ortuzar Rojas (1968-1969), did not take effect
Juan José Larrañeta Olleta, O.P. (1976-1980), appointed Vicar Apostolic here

References

External links
 GCatholic.org 
 Catholic Hierarchy 

Apostolic vicariates
Roman Catholic dioceses in Peru
Christian organizations established in 1900
1900 establishments in Peru
Roman Catholic dioceses and prelatures established in the 19th century